The 1930 Wyoming Cowboys football team was an American football team that represented the University of Wyoming as a member of the Rocky Mountain Conference (RMC) during the 1930 college football season. In their first season under head coach John Rhodes, the Cowboys compiled a 2–5–1 record (1–5–1 against conference opponents), finished tenth in the RMC, and were outscored by a total of 161 to 86.

Schedule

References

Wyoming
Wyoming Cowboys football seasons
Wyoming Cowboys football